Calthorpe is a small village and former civil parish, now in the parish of Erpingham, in the North Norfolk district, in the county of Norfolk, England. In 1931 the parish had a population of 143.

Etymology 
The village name devolved from Old Scandinavian language and has the meaning of outlying farm or small hamlet owned by a man named Kali.

Description 
The it was once a parish itself but was amalgamated into the civil parish of Erpingham in the re-organisation of Norfolk parishes on 1 April 1935. The village and its parish church are centred on a crossroads of Wall road which runs from Wolterton and Erpingham, and Scarrow Beck Lane which runs north to south through the village and links Wickmere to the north with Ingworth.

Domesday Book 
Calthorpe is mentioned in Domesday Book of 1086, where it is called Calatorp or Caletorp. The main landholders of the parish were Roger Bigod, The Abbot of Saint Benedict of Holme and Breton called Tihel of HellÈan. Before 1066 it was held by Godwin of Scottow and was valued at £4 but at the time of the survey the value was listed as £6. The manor was 8 furlongs in Length and 5½ in width and had a taxable value of 9½ pennies. Saint Benedict holdings had 7 smallholders, 7 villages, 1 plough in Lordship, 3 mens ploughs, 4 acres meadow, woodland Pannage for 15 pigs, 1 mill and one third of another. In the Domesday survey fractions were used to indicate that the entry, in this case the second mill, was on an estate that lay within more than one parish. The survey list Guerri and Osbort as being tenants of Tihel of HellÈan. Within these tenant holdings there were 8 smallholders, 3 villagers, 1 plough owned by the lord of the manor, 1½ men's ploughs, 6 acres of meadow, woodland Pannage for 15 pigs, One third of a mill. 3 cobs, 1 head of cattle, 10 pigs and two beehives.

Landmarks and structures

Manor houses 
Within the parish of Calthorpe there is documented evidence of several manor house dating from the medieval period but all traces have now disappeared and there exact locations are not known. The names of three have been recorded as Calthorpe Hall, Hook Hall and Kybald Hall all of which are referred to in medieval documents and in White's gazetteer of 1845.

The parish church of Our Lady and Saint Margaret 
The church standing today was first built in the medieval period although there are remnants of an earlier Norman church within the building. The Norman church replaced an earlier church. Most of the remaining church was built in the 13th century. The church tower was built in the 13th century and is unbuttressed and faced in knapped flint work. Internally the tower has a low arch with several courses of mouldings which finish into the impost. The chancel dates from the 13th century with the nave being re-built sometime in the 15th century. Originally there was a porch on the south elevation doorway now gone. On the north elevation is the door used today which has a recess above the door on the inside which once contained a Saint Christopher as was the practice of placing the saint opposite the main entrance to welcome the parishioners and travellers to the church. The timber roof of the nave dates from the medieval period and is constructed with rows of Arch-braced trusses. The nave has four early English triple lancets perpendicular windows of which only one has any decoration. The widow in the chancel was installed in 1822. The octagonal font dates from the 15th century and sits on a pedestal with four lions, one to each corner with double tracery panel between each hunched lion. The octagonal bowls panels are also decorated with tracery with the underside of the bowl supported by carved demi-figures of angels. The font is topped with a red and green brightly decorated cover which towers above the font. The cover originates from the parish church of Saint Andrews at Buxton. The church is a Grade II listed building (English Heritage Building ID: 224484).

First World War Memorial Plaque 
Set into the wall of the church to the left of the main door is a memorial plaque to the men of the parish of Calthorpe who gave there life during the 1914 – 1918 World War. The inscription reads
IN MEMORY OF THE MEN OF THIS PARISH WHO LOST THEIR LIVES IN THE WAR 1914~1918 THIS TABLET IS PLACED BY THE PEOPLE OF CALTHORP
The men listed here are all on the plaque
Alfred Allard
William Anderson
Arthur Brett
Barney Burgess
John Burton
Basil Horner
William Horner
Joseph Newstead
Jack Wright
R.I.P.

Calthorpe Watermill 
The Domesday survey recorded that there were two watermills in Calthorpe although there were no documented evidence reference the watermills until 1249. By that date there was only one watermill south of the village on the River Bure. The watermill was constructed from timber and needed constant maintenance, a situation which was documented by the rectory accounts. The mills situation made access difficult and this eventually lead to the mill falling into disrepair until in 1453 it is recorded as having collapsed.

Gallery

References

External links

Villages in Norfolk
Former civil parishes in Norfolk
Erpingham